Croydon is a single-member electoral district for the South Australian House of Assembly. Named after the suburb of Croydon, it is a  suburban electorate in Adelaide's inner north-west. In addition to Croydon, it includes Angle Park, Athol Park, Bowden, Brompton, Croydon Park, Devon Park, Dudley Park, Ferryden Park, Kilkenny, Mansfield Park, Regency Park, Renown Park, Ridleyton, West Croydon, Woodville Gardens; and parts of Allenby Gardens, Welland, and West Hindmarsh.

Croydon was created in the 1998 electoral distribution as a safe Labor seat, replacing the abolished Spence. It was first contested at the 2002 state election, where it was won by future Attorney-General and Speaker Michael Atkinson, the previous member for Spence since 1989. The seat is split between the marginal federal seats of Adelaide and Hindmarsh and the safe federal Labor seat of Port Adelaide. Following the 2014 election Croydon became Labor's safest seat on an 18.9 percent margin.

The 2016 redistribution by the electoral districts boundaries commission saw the northern boundary of Croydon district extended northwards from the vicinity of Regency Road to Grand Junction Road. The southwestern boundary also changed, with Beverley, Woodville Park, Hindmarsh and Flinders Park being absorbed by the neighbouring districts of Cheltenham and West Torrens.

In February 2017, Atkinson announced his intention to resign from parliament and not recontest the seat as of the 2018 election. Upper house MP Peter Malinauskas succeeded him at the 2018 election.

The 2020 redistribution added Kilburn and the north-west quarter of Prospect from neighboring Enfield. The parts of Allenby Gardens, Welland and West Hindmarsh were removed from and added to the electorate of West Torrens.

Members for Croydon

Election results

Notes

References
 ECSA profile for Croydon: 2018
 ABC profile for Croydon: 2018
 Poll Bludger profile for Croydon: 2018

Electoral districts of South Australia
2002 establishments in Australia